Flamanville is a commune in the Manche department in north-western France.

Port 
The port of Flamanville, in the northern part of the commune, is known as Diélette.  During the summer a high-speed passenger ferry is operated from there to Alderney and Guernsey by Manche Iles Express.

Heraldry

Nuclear plants
On its territory is installed the seaside Flamanville Nuclear Power Plant, established there in the 1980s, with two PWR reactors of 1300 MWe each, which were put into operation in 1986 and 1987.

Flamanville has been selected for the installation of the first French EPR reactor, which will be Flamanville's third reactor, near the two existing ones. Whether or not Flamanville 3, EPR, actually becomes operational is political, as many prominent politicians are opposed to it.

There are also plans for later fourth reactor.

See also
Communes of the Manche department

References

External links

Official website of the Mairie
EPR - Flamanville 3 project 
Construction halted at flagship French nuclear reactor over problems in concrete base
Greenpeace activists block restart of French nuclear reactor construction 
Greenpeace resumes protest actions against Flamanville-3

Communes of Manche
Populated coastal places in France